General Raymond Anthony Thomas III (also known as Tony Thomas; born October 6, 1958) is a retired general officer of the United States Army and former commander of the United States Special Operations Command.

He participated in numerous combat operations during his career, such as Operation Urgent Fury 1983, Operation Just Cause in 1989, Gulf War in 1991, and since 2001 the wars in Iraq and Afghanistan. Every year between 2001 and 2013 (minus his time in Iraq with the 1st Armored Division in 2007), Thomas deployed to Afghanistan as part of various special operations units.

Military career
Thomas was born in Pennsylvania on October 6, 1958 and graduated from the United States Military Academy in 1980. Thomas was a member of the 75th Ranger Regiment. He led a Ranger Rifle platoon from A Company, 2nd Ranger Battalion during the Invasion of Grenada in 1983, that was dropped from an MC-130 onto a landing strip in Grenada. After completion of Infantry Officer Advanced Course in early 1986, he was assigned as Assistant S-3, Plans/Liaison Officer with 75th Ranger Regiment at Fort Benning, Georgia until 1987. Thomas was then assigned as a company commander with 3rd Ranger Battalion. In 1989, during the Invasion of Panama, he led his Ranger Rifle Company in another combat jump.

In 1992, Thomas volunteered for and completed a specialized selection course for assignment to 1st Special Forces Operational Detachment-Delta, also known as Delta Force. He served as Operations Officer, Troop Commander, Executive Officer and B Squadron Commander from 1992 to 1994 and 1996 to 1999. In June 1995 Thomas earned a master's degree from the Naval Command and Staff College in Newport, Rhode Island followed by assignment as Executive Officer, 2nd Ranger Battalion from June 1995 to July 1996. From 2000 to 2002, he served as commanding officer of the 1st Ranger Battalion, 75th Ranger Regiment.

Thomas crossed over from the special operations realm into the conventional warfare realm when he was selected by Lieutenant General Mark P. Hertling, then-commander of the 1st Armored Division, to be his deputy commander during the Iraq War, from 2007 to 2008. During that tour the division worked alongside Arabs and Kurds and despite the difficult relationship between the ethnic groups Thomas was praised by Hertling for "his ability to quickly fuse intelligence" adding, "He helped us fight better." After his tenure in the 1st Armored Division came to an end Thomas returned to special operations. From 2010 until 2012 Thomas served as the deputy commander of Joint Special Operations Command. As a major general, Thomas was in charge of all United States and NATO special forces in Afghanistan from 2012 until 2013. Every year between 2001 and 2013 (minus his time in Iraq with the 1st Armored Division in 2007) Thomas deployed to Afghanistan as part of various special operations units.

After commanding special forces units in Afghanistan, Thomas was promoted to lieutenant general and was reassigned to CIA headquarters in Langley, Virginia where he served as the Associate Director of the Central Intelligence Agency for Military Affairs. In August 2014, Thomas replaced Joseph Votel as the commander of Joint Special Operations Command. Votel was promoted to four-star general and replaced Admiral William H. McRaven as the commander of United States Special Operations Command (USSOCOM). In a ceremony at MacDill Air Force Base, Florida, on March 30, 2016 Thomas took command of USSOCOM and received his fourth star. General Thomas retired from active duty on March 29, 2019. 

Thomas currently resides in the Tampa Bay area and was honored prior to Game 5 of the 2021 Stanley Cup Finals.

Dates of rank

Awards and decorations

References

|-

1958 births
Living people
United States Military Academy alumni
Military personnel from Pennsylvania
United States Army Rangers
College of Naval Command and Staff alumni
United States Army personnel of the Gulf War
United States Army personnel of the Iraq War
United States Army personnel of the War in Afghanistan (2001–2021)
Recipients of the Defense Distinguished Service Medal
Recipients of the Defense Superior Service Medal
Recipients of the Legion of Merit
United States Army generals